Old Washington County Library is a historic library building located at 21 Summit Avenue in Hagerstown, Washington County, Maryland, United States. It is a two-story Neo-Georgian stone masonry structure of monumental proportions, built 1900–01. The building appears to be one huge story from the façade.  The building was designed by the noted late 19th-century American architect Bruce Price (1845–1903) and erected  for the Washington County Free Library. It was used by the library until 1965.

It was listed on the National Register of Historic Places in 1978.

References

External links
, including undated photo, at Maryland Historical Trust

Library buildings completed in 1901
Libraries on the National Register of Historic Places in Maryland
Buildings and structures in Hagerstown, Maryland
National Register of Historic Places in Washington County, Maryland
Bruce Price buildings